Caleb Chapman’s Soundhouse is a musician performance training program based in Salt Lake City, Utah. It was founded by Caleb Chapman in 1998.

Soundhouse has 25 bands with musicians aged 8 – 18, as well as some adult groups, in the genres of jazz, soul, swing, rock, reggae, funk, and fusion. The program teaches a multi-disciplinary skill set (such as business, showmanship, management, and marketing). Members of the groups rotate each year and manage the operations and promotion of the bands. They have recorded and released four albums. The executive leadership team includes Caleb Chapman (Founder and Chairman) and Andrew Surmani (CEO).

Awards 
Bands and members of the program have received awards, such as:
 85 DownBeat Awards
 32 Best of State Medals for arts and education category
 3 Best of State Statue (BOSS) Awards from Utah
Every member of the program has received scholarship offers for colleges and universities, averaging a collective $1 million each year (with a total of $2.5 million in 2016).

Alumni 
Prominent Soundhouse alumni include:
 Andrew Tolman, previously Imagine Dragons and currently Moth & the Flame
 Jaydon Bean, Redlight King
 Chase Baird, Saxophonist & Recording Artist
 Haven Mcgee, Vocalist
 Evan Wharton, Anchorage 
 Caleb Chapman, Saxophonist and Entertainer
Alumni have also gone on to attend universities such as The Juilliard School, Berklee College of Music, the New England Conservatory of Music, University of Southern California, University of Miami, University of North Texas,  Eastman School of Music, Georgetown, Snow College, and Brigham Young University.

Groups 
Current groups include:
 The flagship ensemble Caleb Chapman's Crescent Super Band (Modern Big Band/American Songbook)
 Time Check Jazz Orchestra (Big Band Jazz)
 Voodoo Orchestra (Jump Swing)
 La Onda Caribeña (Latin Jazz & Salsa)
 Soul Research Foundation (Motown Soul)
 Vicious Beat (Pop & R&B)
 The Inevitables (Swing & Alternative)
 Hooligans Brass Band (New Orleans Brass Band)
 Little Big Band (Big Band Jazz)
 New Bop Big Band (Big Band Jazz)
 Oo La La (Vocal Jazz)
 Siren Sounds (Vocal Jazz)
 Kingston Winter (Reggae)
 Lo-Fi Riot (Ska)
 Jukebox Antihero (Classic Rock)

Bands from the program have performed in Carnegie Hall, Telluride Jazz Celebration, North Sea Jazz Festival, Montreux Jazz Festival, Vienne Jazz Festival, Umbria Jazz Festival, Jazz Education Network Conferences, The Midwest Clinic, The Apollo Theater, and The Utah Jazz basketball games. Outside of the U.S., bands from the program have performed in Cuba, France, Italy, Sweden, Mexico, Canada, the Netherlands, Switzerland, England, and Scotland. 
They have performed alongside GRAMMY-winners Joe Lovano, Nicholas Payton, Gordon Goodwin, Dave Weckl, Brian Lynch, Poncho Sanchez, Dave Samuels, Jeff Coffin, Esperanza Spalding, Randy Brecker, Ernie Watts, Christian McBride, Bob Mintzer, Peter Erskine, David Paich, Branford Marsalis, and Kirk Whalum.

Guest artists have included members from: Dave Matthews Band, Toto, Maroon 5, Journey, Big Bad Voodoo Daddy, Tower of Power, The Rolling Stones, Genesis, and the Saturday Night Live Band.

References

External links 
 Caleb Chapman Music
 Crescent Super Band
 Jazz Education Network
 GAM Foundation

Music education in the United States
Companies based in Salt Lake City
1998 establishments in Utah